The Rural Municipality of Pense No. 160 is a rural municipality (RM) in the Canadian province of Saskatchewan within Census Division No. 6 and  Division No. 2. It is located in the southeast portion of the province.

History 
The RM of Pense No. 160 incorporated as a rural municipality on January 1, 1913. Prior to incorporation, the RM had its beginnings in 1897 with a single township having been formed as a local improvement district (LID). In 1904, small LIDs made way for larger LIDs formed in accordance with the LID Ordinance of 1903. The larger LID No. 160 ultimately preceded the formation of the RM of Pense No. 160. In 1923, the population of the RM of Pense No. 160 had risen 2,227 residents.

Geography 
Nicolle Flats Nature Area (Buffalo Pound Provincial Park) is located in the RM as well. The burrowing owl (athene cunicularia), an endangered animal, makes its home in this area. Bigmouth buffalo (ictiobus cyprinellus) is of special concern in this ecoregion.

Communities and localities 
The following urban municipalities are surrounded by the RM.

Towns
Pense

Villages
Belle Plaine

The following unincorporated communities are within the RM.

Localities
Cottonwood
Eastview
Kalium
Keystown
Madrid
Pattee
Schulerville
Stelcam
Stony Beach
Stony Beach Airport

Demographics 

Government 
The RM of Pense No. 160 is governed by an elected municipal council and an appointed administrator that meets on the second Wednesday of every month. The reeve of the RM is Tom Lemon while its administrator is Cathy Ripplinger. The RM's office is located in Pense.

Infrastructure 

Education 
This rural municipality was home to several one room school districts such as Leamington, Rose Park, Eastview, Fairville, Coulee, Stony Beach, Rocky Lake, Sarawak, Bruceville, Wayside, Kenilworth, Cottonwood, Wellington, Broadway, Coventry, Blink Bonny, Wascana and Fosest. These have been replaced by consolidated schools and the larger school divisions of today.

References 

P
Division No. 6, Saskatchewan